The Gâlcești is a right tributary of the river Amaradia in Romania. It flows into the Amaradia near the village Gâlcești.

References

Rivers of Romania
Rivers of Gorj County